Marginella piperata is a species of sea snail, a marine gastropod mollusk in the family Marginellidae, the margin snails.

Description

Distribution

Subspecies

Subspecies Marginella piperata albocincta Sowerby, 1846]
Subspecies Marginella piperata fuscopicta Turton, 1932
Subspecies Marginella piperata lutea Sowerby III, 1889
Subspecies Marginella piperata monozona Turton, 1932
Subspecies Marginella piperata strigata Sowerby III, 1889

References

Marginellidae